The 2001–02 Oklahoma Sooners men's basketball team represented the University of Oklahoma. The head coach was Kelvin Sampson. The team played its home games in the Lloyd Noble Center and was a member of the Big 12 Conference.

Roster

Schedule

|-
! colspan=9 style="background:#960018; color:#FFFDD0;"| Regular season

|-
! colspan=9 style="background:#960018; color:#FFFDD0;"| Big 12 tournament

|-
! colspan=9 style="background:#960018; color:#FFFDD0;"| NCAA tournament

NCAA basketball tournament
Seeding in brackets
West
 Oklahoma (2) 71, Illinois Chicago (15) 63
 Oklahoma 78, Xavier, Ohio (7) 65
Oklahoma 88, Arizona (3) 67
Oklahoma 81, Missouri (12) 75
Final Four
Indiana 73, Oklahoma 64

References

Oklahoma Sooners men's basketball seasons
NCAA Division I men's basketball tournament Final Four seasons
Oklahoma
Oklahoma